The 2018 Ottawa municipal election was a municipal election that was held on October 22, 2018, to elect the mayor of Ottawa, Ottawa City Council and the Ottawa-Carleton Public and Catholic School Boards. The election was held on the same day as elections in every other municipality in Ontario.

The electoral system used is First past the post. Successful candidates do not need to have majority support of the voters in their district. Seven of the 23 successful ward councillors were elected with less than majority of votes in their districts.

Mayoral candidates

Hamid Alakozai
Nominated May 10. Former CF reservist member. Considered running for president of Afghanistan in 2011. Past advisor to the attorney general of Afghanistan.

Ahmed Bouragba
Nominated July 26. Bilingual teacher and former elected Council member for the Ontario College of Teachers. Bouragba is a social justice advocate and civil liberties activist. Ran for Conseil des écoles publiques de l'Est de l'Ontario trustee in 2014. 
Citation: Y.B. v. Conseil des écoles publiques de l'Est de l'Ontario, 2017 HRTO 1240 (CanLII)

Bernard Couchman
Nominated May 1.  Immigrant from Guyana; operates a marketing company. He ran for mayor in 2014, finishing in last place (8th) with 1,255 votes (0.51%).

Clive Doucet
Nominated July 27. City councillor for Capital Ward from 2001 to 2010. He represented Capital Ward on the Ottawa-Carleton Regional Council from 1997 to 2000. Ran for mayor in 2010.

Joey Drouin
Nominated July 27. Businessman. Running on a platform of combining Ottawa and Gatineau.

Ryan Lythall
Nominated July 9. Disabilities advocate.

Craig MacAulay
Nominated July 11. Ran for city council in 2010 and 2014 in College Ward.

Bruce McConville
Nominated July 26. Garage operator from Vanier. Ran for city council in 2003 and 2006 in Rideau-Vanier Ward. McConville was born August 30, 1962 in Eastview, Ontario (now Vanier). He dropped out of high school and would later start his garage in 1981.

Michael Pastien
Nominated May 16. Self described "futurist". Ran for city council in 2014 in Bay Ward and for public school trustee in 2010.

Moises Schachtler
Nominated July 4. A former student of the University of Ottawa.

James T. Sheahan
Nominated July 25. North Gower resident.

Jim Watson
Mayor Jim Watson had declared his intention to run for re-election in early 2017. He filed his nomination forms on May 1.

Polls

Mayoral results

Results by ward

City Council

Orléans Ward
Incumbent councillor Bob Monette had indicated he would be running for re-election but dropped out on June 13.

Nominated candidates
Bob Monette - incumbent councillor
Rick Bédard
Toby Bossert
Mireille Brownhill - Community association executive, not-for-profit coordinator, community volunteer.
Guy Desroches
Diego Elizondo
Dina Epale
Doug Feltmate - Former president of the Ottawa-Orléans Provincial Liberal Association. Withdrew, but will be on the ballot.
Jarrod Goldsmith - Canadian small business community builder. Holds a master's degree in Anthropology from the University of Alberta. Musician and entrepreneur; founder of Sax Appeal and eSAX (The Entrepreneur Social Advantage Experience), 
Miranda Gray
Geoffrey Nicholas Griplas
Catherine Kitts - former editor of the Orléans Star newspaper, advocating to see more women elected to Ottawa City Council. Graduate of Carleton University's renowned School of Journalism.
Shannon Kramer
Matthew Luloff - Canadian Forces veteran, served in Afghanistan, formerly worked for several Members of Parliament and most recently for the Minister of National Defence. Holds a degree in Public Affairs and Policy Management. Mental Health advocate. Member of the Liberal Party of Canada.
Qamar Masood
Louise Soyez withdrew, but will be on the ballot 
Kevin Tetreault
Don Yetman

Results:

Innes Ward
Incumbent councillor Jody Mitic announced he would not be running for re-election.

Nominated candidates:
Laura Dudas - ran in 2014. Former journalist. President of the Blackburn Community Association and member of the Orleans Chamber of Commerce. 
Donna Leith-Gudbranson - campaign manager and assistant to former councillor Rainer Bloess. President of the Chapel Hill South Community Association and the school council at École élémentaire publique Le Prélude. 
Tammy Lynch - assistant to previous councillor, Jody Mitic (director of community relations)
François Trépanier - Consultant. Served for 28 years in the Canadian Forces. Ran in 2014.

Results:

Barrhaven Ward
Nominated candidates
Franklin Epape - teacher at La Cité collégiale and president of the board of Cooperation Integration Canada
Jan Harder - incumbent councillor.
Ahmad Malgarai
Atiq Qureshi - works in income tax consulting
Hadi Wess - former president of the Student Federation of the University of Ottawa

Results:

Kanata North Ward
Incumbent councillor Marianne Wilkinson had announced she would not be running for re-election.

Nominated candidates:
Philip Bloedow
David Gourlay - former president of the Ottawa Champions baseball team.
Matt Muirhead - teacher, 2014 candidate
Lorne Neufeldt
Jenna Sudds - Former executive director of the Kanata North business improvement association. Endorsed by Wilkinson.

Results:

West Carleton-March Ward
Nominated candidates:
Eli El-Chantiry - incumbent city councillor
James Parsons - Ran in this ward in 2010 and 2014. 
Judi Varga-Toth - small business owner and executive director

Results:

Stittsville Ward
Nominated candidates:
Glen Gower - director of marketing and communications and founder of a local community blog.
Shad Qadri - incumbent city councillor

Results:

Bay Ward
Incumbent councillor Mark Taylor did not run for re-election.

Nominated candidates:
Erica Dath - background in "finance and public service"
Don Dransfield - management consultant. Husband of incumbent Ottawa West—Nepean MP Anita Vandenbeld. Ran for the Ontario Liberal Party in  Nepean—Carleton in the 2011 Ontario general election. Also ran for city council in 2006. 
Theresa Kavanagh - incumbent OCDSB trustee, NDP staffer, and wife of former city councillor Alex Cullen Ran for a seat as the NDP candidate in the House of Commons of Canada in the 1988 federal election in Ottawa West.
Marc Lugert - former chair of the Queensway Terrace Community Association and current vice president of the Ottawa Girls Hockey Association
Trevor Robinson - Ran in the 2014 municipal election.

Results:

College Ward
Nominated candidates:
Rick Chiarelli - incumbent city councillor
Emilie Coyle - lawyer; director of the Refugee Sponsorship Program
Ryan Kennery - communications strategist; former director of communications for mayor Jim Watson

Results:

Knoxdale-Merivale Ward
Nominated candidates:
Warren Arshinoff - former member of the Ottawa Youth Cabinet for Ward 9 (2001-2004)
James Dean - real-estate agent and board member of Quality Living House Cooperative
Keith Egli - incumbent city councillor
Luigi Mangone - public servant
Peter Anthony Weber - heavy equipment operator.

Gloucester-Southgate Ward
Nominated candidates:
Diane Deans - incumbent city councillor
Alek Golijanin 
Perry Sabourin - Social Worker
Sam Soucy - Executive assistant for Liberal MP Fayçal El-Khoury.
Robert Swaita - Restaurant owner

Beacon Hill-Cyrville Ward
Nominated candidates:
Michael Schurter - Realtor and parliamentary office manager for Conservative MP Peter Kent.
Tim Tierney - incumbent councillor

Results:

Rideau-Vanier Ward
Nominated candidates:
Salar Changiz
Mathieu Fleury - incumbent councillor. 
Thierry Harris - former vice president of the Lower Town Community Association. Former producer for CBC/Radio Canada and press officer for the National Film Board. 
Matt Lowe - Veteran and member of the Conservative Party of Canada.

Results:

Rideau-Rockcliffe Ward
Peter Heyck
Tobi Nussbaum - incumbent city councillor

Results:

Somerset Ward
Nominated candidates:
Arthur David - public servant
Jerry Kovacs - human rights lawyer
Catherine McKenney - incumbent councillor
Merdod Zopyrus - Carleton University student

Results:

Kitchissippi Ward
Nominated candidates:
Jeff Leiper - incumbent councillor.
Daniel Stringer - former aide to Liberal MPP Richard Patten. Has run in this ward in 2003, 2006 (dropping out) and 2010.

Results:

River Ward
Incumbent councillor Riley Brockington ran for re-election

Nominated candidates:
Riley Brockington - incumbent city councillor
Fabien Kalala Cimankinda - entrepreneur
Kerri Keith - NAC box-office supervisor and economics student
Hassib Reda - Finance commissioner of the University of Ottawa Graduate Student Association

Results:

Capital Ward
Incumbent councillor David Chernushenko ran for re-election.

Nominated candidates
Jide Afolabi - lawyer/negotiator 
Anthony Carricato - policy analyst. Former vice president of the Glebe Community Association who works in the office of the Speaker of the House of Commons of Canada. Member of the Liberal Party of Canada. 
David Chernushenko - incumbent city councillor. 
Christine McAllister - business director. President of the Glebe Community Association. Endorsed by Ottawa Centre MP Catherine McKenna. Also a member of the Liberal Party. 
Shawn Menard - incumbent Ottawa-Carleton District School Board trustee. Endorsed by Ottawa Centre MPP Joel Harden.

Results:

Alta Vista Ward
Incumbent councillor Jean Cloutier ran for re-election

Nominated candidates:
Jean Cloutier - incumbent city councillor 
Clinton Cowan - Labour relations expert. 2010 and 2014 candidate in this ward
Kevin Kit - Auditor. President of the Elmvale Acres Community Association.
Raylene Lang-Dion - Federal public servant. Former chair of Equal Voice. Past member of the Liberal Party of Canada.
Mike McHarg - gay rights activist 
John Redins - 2014 candidate and former Party for People with Special Needs provincial and federal Green Party candidate.

Results:

Cumberland Ward
Incumbent councillor Stephen Blais ran for re-election.

Nominated candidates:
Stephen Blais - incumbent councillor.
Jensen Boire
Cameron Rose Jette - Human rights/social justice student at Carleton University.

Results:

Osgoode Ward

Nominated candidates:
Auguste Banfalvi 
George Darouze - incumbent city councillor 
Mark Scharfe - Cattle farmer and former police officer. Ran in this ward in 2014. 
Kim Sheldrick - Stay at home mother and volunteer. Ran in this ward in 2014
Jay Tysick - Leader of the Ontario Party and Candidate for Carleton in 2018 Ontario Election. Former interim leader of the Ontario Alliance. 2018 Ontario PC nomination candidate for Carleton. Former aide to councillor Rick Chiarelli.

Results:

Rideau-Goulbourn Ward
Nominated candidates:
David Brown - Former assistant to incumbent councillor Scott Moffatt, former president of the Richmond Agricultural Society and former staffer for Conservative MP Pierre Poilievre.
Scott Moffatt - incumbent city councillor

Results:

Gloucester-South Nepean Ward

Nominated candidates:
Zaff Ansari - IT Professor; NDP candidate for Nepean in 2018 Ontario Election
Carol Anne Meehan - former CTV Ottawa news anchor
Irene Mei
Michael Qaqish - incumbent councillor
Harpreet Singh - Academic manager at Algonquin College

Results:

Kanata South Ward
Nominated candidates:
Steve Anderson - Public servant/analyst. President of the Katimavik-Hazeldean Community Association.
Mike Brown - Accountant
Allan Hubley - incumbent city councillor
Doug Large - Sales and marketing manager

Results:

School Board Trustee

Ottawa Catholic School Board

Zone 1

Zone 2

Zone 3

Zone 4

Zone 5

Zone 6

Zone 7

Zone 8

Zone 9

Zone 10

Ottawa-Carleton District School Board

Zone 1

Zone 2

Zone 3

Zone 4

Zone 5

Zone 6

Zone 7

Zone 8

Zone 9

Zone 10

Zone 11

Zone 12

Conseil des écoles catholiques du Centre-Est

Zone 4

Zone 5

Zone 6

Zone 7

Zone 8

Zone 9

Zone 10

Zone 11

Conseil des écoles publiques de l'Est de l'Ontario

Zone 6

Zone 7

Zone 8

Zone 9

Zone 10

Zone 11

Zone 12

References

External links
Nominated candidates

2018
2018 Ontario municipal elections
election, 2018